Abbottabad Public School (APS), formerly Railway Public School and Abbottabad Public School and College, is a public, all boys, boarding school for 7th to 12th grade students, located in Abbottabad, Pakistan. APS follows the philosophy of the British boarding schools where academic rigour is balanced with a disciplined boarding life with activities ranging from intramural sports to debating and cultural events. Abbottabad Public School is located at an altitude of about 4500 feet.

History 

In 1957, Pakistan Railways opened up a school outside Abbottabad on official railways land 'donated' by Sardar Bahadur Khan, brother of General Ayub Khan from Haripur, Hazara. who later became the President of Pakistan. The school was called Railway Public School. After two years it was closed and then after a gap of one year, in April 1961, the school was renamed as Abbottabad Public School.

In 1986, Muhammad Zia-ul-Haq, the then President, renamed the institution as Abbottabad Public School & College. The School's Board of Governors, in its meeting on July 20, 2002, deleted the words “and College” and gave the institute its original name Abbottabad Public School. It is popularly known as APS and its alumni as Abbottonians. Abbottabad Public School had the word "College" attached to it sometime in the 90's.
The founding Principal was Mr. M. A. Rahman.

The main campus is 10 km outside Abbottabad on the main Mansehra Road, that eventually becomes Karakoram Highway. The school is surrounded by deep natural ravine in almost a U-shape. The only non-crevice side faces a high mountain. The Karakoram Highway passes between the school and the mountain.

Notable alumni 

 Shaukat Aziz – former Prime Minister of Pakistan
 Nasir-ul-Mulk - former Chief Justice of Pakistan & Caretaker Prime Minister of Pakistan 
 Ahmad Mukhtar – former Defence Minister of Pakistan
 Shehzad Arbab – former Chief Secretary, KP & Advisor to PM Imran Khan on Establishment
 Ahmad Saeed – CEO Servis Industries
 Major General Ameer Faisal Alvi – former GOC Special Service Group (SSG)
 Arbab Alamgir Khan – Former Federal Minister of Communications
 Omar Asghar Khan – former Federal Minister, founder of Sungei, PILER and SEBCON, and Qaumi Jamhoori Party
 Captain Akash Rabbani - First Martyr of Operation Zarb-e-Azb
 Bilal Omar Khan - Major General
 Haider Ali Khan - MNA Pakistan Tehreek-e-Insaf
 Shafaat Ullah Shah - Lieutenant General (R)

See also 

 Army Burn Hall College
 Pakistan International Public School and College

References 

Boys' schools in Pakistan
Boarding schools in Pakistan
Schools in Abbottabad
Buildings and structures in Abbottabad
Educational institutions established in 1961
1961 establishments in Pakistan
Schools in Khyber Pakhtunkhwa
Schools in Pakistan